Typha sistanica is a plant species native to Iran. The species grows in freshwater marshes.

References

sistanica
Freshwater plants
Flora of Iran
Plants described in 1978